"Signs" is a song by Canadian rapper Drake. It was released as a single on June 23, 2017. It was launched in tandem with Louis Vuitton's SS18 collection for Paris Fashion Week

Track listing
Personnel

Adapted from TIDAL.

 40 – production, songwriting, recording
 Supa Dups – additional production, songwriting
 Drake – songwriting, vocals
 Young Thug – songwriting
 Ashante Reid  – songwriting
 Noel Campbell – mixing

Charts

Weekly charts

Year-end charts

Certifications

Release history

References

Drake (musician) songs
2017 songs
2017 singles
Songs written by Drake (musician)
Cash Money Records singles
Song recordings produced by 40 (record producer)
Songs written by Young Thug
Songs written by 40 (record producer)
Songs written by Supa Dups